Kurt Garger (born 15 September 1960) is an Austrian football manager and former player.

References

1960 births
Living people
Austrian footballers
Association football defenders
Austria international footballers
SK Rapid Wien players
FC Admira Wacker Mödling players
FC Swarovski Tirol players
Austrian Football Bundesliga players
Austrian football managers
Slovak Super Liga managers
FC Admira Wacker Mödling managers
FC DAC 1904 Dunajská Streda managers
TSV Hartberg managers
First Vienna FC managers
FSV Frankfurt managers
Austrian expatriate football managers
Austrian expatriate sportspeople in Slovakia
Expatriate football managers in Slovakia
Austrian expatriate sportspeople in Germany
Expatriate football managers in Germany
Austrian expatriate sportspeople in China
Expatriate football managers in China